The Goose Creek Stone Bridge crosses Goose Creek in Loudoun County, Virginia. The turnpike was replaced by U.S. Route 50, which crosses the creek a short distance to the south. The bridge is no longer used for vehicular traffic. The bridge was a center of fighting in the American Civil War on June 21, 1863, during the Battle of Upperville.

The Goose Creek Bridge was placed on the National Register of Historic Places on October 9, 1974.

See also
List of bridges on the National Register of Historic Places in Virginia

References

Road bridges on the National Register of Historic Places in Virginia
Bridges completed in 1810
National Register of Historic Places in Loudoun County, Virginia
Pedestrian bridges in Virginia
Former road bridges in the United States
Stone arch bridges in the United States
Buildings and structures in Loudoun County, Virginia